Arthur Edward Rory Guinness, 4th Earl of Iveagh,  (born 25 August 1969), styled Viscount Elveden until 1992, is an Anglo-Irish aristocrat and businessman. He is a member of the Guinness family.

Biography
An Anglo-Irish aristocrat, Iveagh is the son of Benjamin Guinness, 3rd Earl of Iveagh, and his wife Miranda Smiley, and is known to his family and friends as Edward, or Ned, Iveagh.

Becoming Earl of Iveagh on his father's death on 18 June 1992, when he was aged 23, he was then one of the youngest hereditary peers entitled to sit in the House of Lords, which he regularly attended. He did not join a political party but sat as a crossbencher. On 11 November 1999, he was among the majority of the hereditary members who were removed from the Lords by the House of Lords Act 1999.

On 27 October 2001, Iveagh married the interior designer Clare Hazell at St Andrew's and St Patrick's church, Elveden, Suffolk. The couple have two sons, including Arthur, Viscount Elveden (born 2002).

Iveagh lives on the  Elveden Estate in Suffolk, England, which comprises some 2.6% of the county. The land is occupied as a single arable farm for growing root vegetables, with cereals as a break crop. Approximately  is woodland.

In 1999 Iveagh sold his family's Irish home, Farmleigh and its park, adjacent to the Phoenix Park in Dublin, to the Irish Government for the market price of €29.2m (£18.9m).

Arms

References

External links

 A Year in the Life of a Country Estate – A series of 12 articles about Elveden from the BBC, dating from 2003.

1969 births
Living people
20th-century Anglo-Irish people
21st-century Anglo-Irish people
Edward Guinness, 4th Earl of Iveagh
Earls of Iveagh
Deputy Lieutenants of Suffolk
Conservative Party (UK) hereditary peers
People from Elveden
People from County Kildare
Iveagh